Kurakarizawa Dam is an earthfill dam located in Akita Prefecture in Japan. The dam is used for irrigation. The catchment area of the dam is 1.9 km2. The dam impounds about 2  ha of land when full and can store 122 thousand cubic meters of water. The construction of the dam was completed in 1945.

References

Dams in Akita Prefecture
1945 establishments in Japan